The Pakistan Workers' Federation (PWF) is a national trade union centre in Pakistan. It is the largest labour organisation in the country and its affiliated unions are among the oldest. The centre itself was created in 1994 through a merger of three former national centres. It is independent and non-political. Internationally, it is affiliated with ITUC.

Organisation & affiliates
Trade unions affiliated with PWF include:
 All Pakistan Federation of Labour (APFOL)
 All Pakistan Federation of Trade Unions (APFTU)
 Pakistan National Federation of Trade Unions (PNFTU)

History
In 1994, All Pakistan Federation of Trade Unions (APFTU), All Pakistan Federation of Labour (APFOL) and Pakistan National Federation of Trade Unions (PNFTU) held an assembly in Abbottabad, where they announced their intention to merge within ten years. The merger did take place within that time and the founding convention of PWF took place in Islamabad on September 7, 2005. All three merging unions remained affiliated individually with the ITUC.

ITUC put out a call for restoration of a democratic system in Pakistan in 2007 along with Pakistan Workers Federation. In 2011, thousands of workers protested against price hikes in Islamabad.

References

Trade unions in Pakistan
Labour history of Pakistan